Boulguin is a town in the Rollo Department of Bam Province in northern Burkina Faso. It has a population of 1025.

References

Populated places in the Centre-Nord Region
Bam Province